Ralph Forster  (21 July 1835 – 17 February 1879) was an English first-class cricketer and barrister.

The son of Thomas Forster, he was born at Spring Hill in County Durham in July 1835. He was educated at Harrow School, before going up to Caius College, Cambridge. While studying at Cambridge, he made a single appearance in first-class cricket for Cambridge University against the Marylebone Cricket Club (MCC) at Lord's in 1859. A student of Lincoln's Inn, he was called to the bar in January 1860. During his legal career, Forster wrote the book Copyhold and Customary Tenures. Beginning in 1861, Forster began playing first-class cricket for the MCC, making sixteen appearances to 1870. He had little success in these matches, scoring 117 runs at a low average of 5.85 and a highest score of 40 not out. He married Frances Joanna Stone in December 1862. A justice of the peace, he died at Rome in February 1879 from Bright's disease.

References

External links

1835 births
1879 deaths
Cricketers from County Durham
People educated at Harrow School
Alumni of Gonville and Caius College, Cambridge
English cricketers
Cambridge University cricketers
Members of Lincoln's Inn
Marylebone Cricket Club cricketers
English justices of the peace
Deaths from nephritis